A Woman Named Jackie is a 1991 American television miniseries chronicling the life of Jacqueline Kennedy Onassis. It was based on C. David Heymann's 1989 book of the same title.

The miniseries was split into three parts:
A Woman Named Jackie, Part 1: The Bouvier Years (October 13, 1991)
A Woman Named Jackie, Part 2: The Kennedy Years (October 14, 1991)
A Woman Named Jackie, Part 3: The Onassis Years (October 15, 1991)

Cast

Award & Nominations
Emmy Awards (1992)
Won, "Outstanding Miniseries"
Nominated, "Outstanding Individual Achievement in Costume Design for a Miniseries or a Special" (Part I)
Nominated, "Outstanding Sound Mixing for a Drama Miniseries or a Special" (Part III)

See also
 Cultural depictions of Jacqueline Kennedy Onassis
 Cultural depictions of John F. Kennedy

References

External links
 
 

1990s American television miniseries
Films shot in the United States Virgin Islands
Primetime Emmy Award for Outstanding Miniseries winners
Primetime Emmy Award-winning television series
American biographical series
Cultural depictions of Jacqueline Kennedy Onassis
Cultural depictions of Aristotle Onassis
Cultural depictions of John F. Kennedy
Cultural depictions of Marilyn Monroe
Films about the Kennedy family
Films directed by Larry Peerce